John Nixon (March 1, 1727 – March 24, 1815) was an American brigadier general in the Continental Army during the American Revolutionary War.

He was born in Framingham, Massachusetts, on March 1, 1727, to Christopher and Mary Nixon. In 1755 he served in the Massachusetts militia during Sir William Johnson's campaign against the French during the French and Indian War.

In 1775 Nixon had moved to Sudbury, Massachusetts, and was a captain of the town's Minutemen whom he led at the Battles of Lexington and Concord. He and his men fought at Bunker Hill on June 17, 1775, his unit was one of the last to leave the field. After the battle Nixon was promoted to colonel of the 6th Massachusetts Regiment. Col. Nixon's regiment was placed into Gen. John Sullivan's brigade and took part in the New York and New Jersey campaign during 1776. In August 1776, Nixon was promoted to brigadier general, and he commanded a brigade consisting of the 3rd, 5th, 6th and 7th, and 8th Massachusetts Regiments.  He led his brigade in the Battle of Harlem Heights and later in the Saratoga Campaign, when it was reinforced by Cogswell's, Gage's and Mays's regiments of Militia. Nixon's brigade  was involved in the Battle of Bemis Heights in October 1777, and took part in the final assault; during this attack a cannonball passed so close to his head that his sight and hearing were affected the rest of his life. Nixon resigned his commission September 12, 1780.

Nixon moved to Weybridge, Vermont in 1806 and died while visiting his son in Middlebury on March 24, 1815. He was buried at a cemetery on his farm, which was later incorporated into what is now First Weybridge Hill Cemetery.

Family
On February 7, 1754, John Nixon married Thankful Berry (1735-1776), also of Framingham.  In 1778 he married Hannah Gleason (1744-1831), the widow of Capt Micajah Gleason, who was killed at the Battle of White Plains in 1776.

Legacy
General John Nixon Elementary School in Sudbury, Massachusetts, is named in his honor, as is Nixon Road in Framingham, Massachusetts. On Nobscot Hill in Framingham there is a trail named after him which leads to the ruins of his house site.

References
Fisher, Maj. Gen. Carleton and Fisher, Sue Soldiers, Sailors and patriots of the Revolutionary War - Vermont. Canden, Maine, Picton press 1992.
Ketchum, Richard. Saratoga: Turning Point of America's Revolutionary War. New York Holt, 1997.

External links
 and also here
General John Nixon Elementary School

1727 births
1815 deaths
Continental Army generals
Continental Army officers from Massachusetts
People of Massachusetts in the French and Indian War
Massachusetts militiamen in the American Revolution
People from Framingham, Massachusetts